Helcystogramma ectopon is a moth in the family Gelechiidae. It was described by Ronald W. Hodges in 1986. It is found in North America, where it has been recorded from Nebraska and Mississippi.

References

Moths described in 1986
ectopon
Moths of North America